Moschato (before 1957: Μπλάσδο - Blasdo) is a village and a community in the municipal unit of Plastiras, Karditsa regional unit, Greece. In 2011 Moschato had a population of 378 for the village and 428 for the community, which includes the villages Agios Nikolaos and Tsardaki. It is located east of the Lake Plastiras, 4 km southwest of Mitropoli and 12 km southwest of Karditsa.

Population

External links
 Moschato on GTP Travel Pages
 Λίμνη Πλαστήρα - Μοσχάτο

See also

List of settlements in the Karditsa regional unit

References

Populated places in Karditsa (regional unit)